Hsinchu JKO Lioneers (Chinese: 新竹街口攻城獅) is a professional basketball team based in Hsinchu County, Taiwan. They have been part of the P. League+ since the 2020–21 season. The Lioneers were one of the four teams of the inaugural P. League+ season.

Facilities

Home arenas

Training facilities
The Lioneers' training facility is located at the Lioneers Hub, which is opened on November 18, 2021, and it's built near Hsinchu County Stadium. The construction cost approximately $45 million TWD.

Roster

Head coaches

Season-by-season record

References

External links
  
  
  
 

 
P. League+ teams
2020 establishments in Taiwan
basketball teams established in 2020